Plédran (Gallo: Plédran) is a commune in the Côtes-d'Armor department of Brittany in northwestern France.

Population

Inhabitants of Plédran are called plédranais in French.

Twin towns
Plédran is twinned with:

  Bembridge, United Kingdom
  Poviglio, Italy

See also
Communes of the Côtes-d'Armor department

References

External links

 

Communes of Côtes-d'Armor